Mimeoclysia mystrion is a species of moth of the family Tortricidae first described by Józef Razowski in 2013. It is found on Seram Island in Indonesisa.

The wingspan is about 13.5 mm for males and 20 mm for females. The ground colour of the forewings of the males is leaden grey, but becoming brownish costally. The strigulation (fine streaking) is brown, as are the markings, although these are edged with cream and mixed with black in the costal part of the wing. The hindwings are brown. Females have pale cinnamon forewings, sprinkled and strigulated with brown and with rust suffusions and yellowish-brown markings preserved. The hindwings are pale yellowish brown.

Etymology
The specific name refers to the shape of the uncus and is derived from Greek mystrion (meaning a small spoon).

References

Moths described in 2013
Epitymbiini